The Grupo Alacrán (Scorpion Group) is a police tactical unit of the Argentine National Gendarmerie, often referred as the Equipo Antiterrorista de Gendarmería (Gendarmerie Counter-terrorism Team). The division is headquartered in Evita City and responds to high-risk and counterterrorist situations throughout Argentina, but primarily in the rural areas. They also provide limited dignitary protection for government officials traveling in these areas. The members of this unit wear green berets with unit insignia.

Equipment
The basic gear for every Alacrán officer is a standard assault rifle or SMG and pistol. Alacrán Group would gain other weaponry including shotguns and sniper rifles depend on the situation encountered.

The following are the common weapons used by Alacrán Group:
 Glock 17
 Colt M4: Standard Assault Rifle
 Heckler & Koch MP5
 FN P90
 M24 SWS
 Barrett M95
 Franchi SPAS-15

See also

Albatross Group
Hawk Special Operations Brigade
Federal Special Operations Group
Special Operations Troops Company
Argentine Federal Police

Federal law enforcement agencies of Argentina